The 2012–13 San Diego Toreros men's basketball]team represented the University of San Diego during the 2012–13 NCAA Division I men's basketball season. This was head coach Bill Grier's sixth season at San Diego. The Toreros competed in the West Coast Conference and played their home games at the Jenny Craig Pavilion. They finished the season 16–18, 7–9 in WCC play to finish in a tie for fifth place. They advanced to the semifinials of the WCC tournament where they lost to Saint Mary's.

Before the Season

Departures

Recruits

Roster

Schedule and Results

|-
!colspan=12 style="background:#002654; color:#97CAFF;"| Non-conference Regular Season

|-
!colspan=12 style="background:#002654; color:#97CAFF;"| WCC Regular Season

|-
!colspan=12 style="background:#97CAFF; color:#002654;"| 2013 West Coast Conference men's basketball tournament

References

San Diego Toreros men's basketball seasons
San Francisco
San Diego Toreros men's basketball
San Diego Toreros men's basketball